Stanisław Andrzej Gorczyca (born 27 July 1958 in Miłomłyn) is a Polish politician. He was elected to Sejm on 25 September 2005, getting 5822 votes in 34 Elbląg district as a candidate from the Civic Platform list.

He was also a member of Sejm 2001–2005.

See also
Members of Polish Sejm 2005–2007

External links
Stanisław Andrzej Gorczyca – parliamentary page – includes declarations of interest, voting record, and transcripts of speeches.

Members of the Polish Sejm 2001–2005
Members of the Polish Sejm 2005–2007
Civic Platform politicians
1958 births
Living people
University of Warmia and Mazury in Olsztyn alumni
People from Ostróda County